Kawich Peak is a mountain located in central Nye County, Nevada, United States. It is also the 16th most isolated peak in Nevada.

References 

Mountains of Nye County, Nevada
Mountains of Nevada
North American 2000 m summits